Laura Chinchilla Miranda (born 28 March 1959) is a Costa Rican political scientist and politician who served as President of Costa Rica from 2010 to 2014. She was one of Óscar Arias Sánchez's two Vice-Presidents and his administration's Minister of Justice. She was the governing PLN candidate for president in the 2010 general election, where she won with 46.76% of the vote on 7 February. She was the eighth woman president of a Latin American country and the first woman to become President of Costa Rica. She was sworn in as President of Costa Rica on 8 May 2010.

After leaving office, she taught at Georgetown University in 2016. Chinchilla is co-chair of the Inter-American Dialogue think tank and the vice-president of Club de Madrid. Chinchilla previously served as a Fellow at the Georgetown Institute of Politics and Public Service.

Personal life
Chinchilla was born in Carmen Central, San José, in 1959. She is the daughter of Rafael Ángel Chinchilla Fallas, a former comptroller of Costa Rica, and Emilce Miranda Castillo. She married Mario Alberto Madrigal Díaz on 23 January 1982 and divorced on 22 May 1985.

Chinchilla met her second husband, José María Rico Cueto, a Spanish lawyer who held Canadian citizenship, in 1990 while both were working as consultants for the Center for the Administration of Justice at the Florida International University in Miami, Florida. The couple had a son, José María Rico Chinchilla, in 1996. Chinchilla married Rico on 26 March 2000. She was widowed on 15 April 2019, when her husband José María Rico died due to Alzheimer's.

Political career
Chinchilla graduated from the University of Costa Rica and received her master's degree in public policy from Georgetown University.
Prior to entering politics, Chinchilla worked as an NGO consultant in Latin America and Africa, specializing in judicial reform and public security issues. She went on to serve in the José María Figueres Olsen administration as vice-minister for public security (1994–1996) and minister of public security (1996–1998). From 2002 to 2006, she served in the National Assembly as a deputy for the province of San José.

Chinchilla was one of two vice-presidents elected under the second Arias administration (2006–2010). She resigned the vice-presidency in 2008 in order to prepare her run for the presidency in 2010. On 7 June 2009 she won the Partido Liberación Nacional (PLN) primary with a 15% margin over her nearest rival, and was thus endorsed as the party's presidential candidate.

Chinchilla led the Observation Mission deployed by the OAS to Mexico to observe the June 2015 federal election, as well as the Observation Electoral Mission during the 2016 elections in the US, and the electoral process in Brazil and in Paraguay in 2018.

Presidency
Chinchilla's Partido Liberación Nacional is a member of the Socialist International, whose motto is the promotion of "progressive politics for a better world."

The British Foreign and Commonwealth minister with responsibility for Central America, Baroness Kinnock, applauded Chinchilla's election as the first female President of Costa Rica. Kinnock also praised Chinchilla for stating her continued support for the forward thinking approach by the previous government in working to combat climate change and said that the UK would continue to work with Costa Rica on this important issue in 2010.

Chinchilla was expected to give continuity to the previous government's pro-free trade policies. She is considered a social conservative. She opposes gay marriage, but has stated publicly the need for a legal frame to provide fundamental rights to same-sex couples. She supports maintaining the country's prohibition of abortion under most circumstances.

Socio-economic policies
At the time of Chinchilla's inauguration, the economic insecurity caused by the international crisis of 2007 and 2008 had hit the Costa Rican economy. Chinchilla structured a government plan with a comprehensive security approach focused on human security, which had four key components: economic security and competitiveness, social security and welfare, citizen security and social peace, and environmental security and development.
 
Chinchilla helped the economy recover from the effects of the international crisis of 2007–2008, which grew between 2010 and 2013, at an average rate of 4.4%, growth that had remained constant in recent years according to data from ECLAC. Chinchilla also made an improvement in the country's competitiveness indexes, according to the World Economic Forum  and the World Bank, as well as beginning the process of incorporating Costa Rica into the OECD.
 
In social matters, priority was given to the promotion of a comprehensive strategy for early childhood care. Chinchilla's government developed a network of care centers with public-private partnerships, that benefit the children, as well as their mothers who aspire to enter the labor market. This program was recognized by international organizations.

Security
Chinchilla's political platform emphasized anti-crime legislation in response to Costa Rica's growing concerns over safety. In 2010, the year Chinchilla was elected, the country observed a high crime rate in the majority of crimes, which worsened the perception of the state as a guarantor of justice and security.
After conducting a citizen consultation, the Citizen Security and Social Peace Policy (POLSEPAZ) was designed, defining the main strategic lines of action and the need to promote a comprehensive, sustainable and state policy on the matter.
 
With Chinchilla's implementation of her strategies and the prevention, control, and sanctions activities that were carried out, it was possible to contain the growth in crime, and decrease homicide rates, as well as decrease intentional homicides against women, most of which are associated with domestic violence or femicide. During Chinchilla's term, these crimes fell by nearly 70%.

Environmental sustainability
The government sustainability variable was displayed by Chinchilla promoting policies for the generation of clean energy which exceeded 90% of electricity generation from renewable sources, at the end of her term.

Equal importance was given to the protection of the seas, through Chinchilla's extension of marine protection zones and a strong fight against shark finning, this led to international recognition for her efforts made towards sustainability.

Popularity
In 2013, the Mexican opinion poll firm Consulta Mitofsky released a survey that placed Chinchilla as the least popular president in Latin America with a 13% approval rate, just behind Porfirio Lobo of Honduras.

At the end of Chinchilla's presidency, Costa Rica had many economic troubles. Public debt had reached 50% of GDP, unemployment was steadily rising and, despite high annual growth, 20% of the population lived below the poverty line.

Security
During her tenure, improvements were made in security, and the homicide rate, originally 10 for every  100,000 inhabitants, dropped significantly . The WHO had the once high figure a “social pandemic” and it has fluctuated greatly in years prior.

Education
Education became one Chinchilla's greatest priorities. She moved into action Article 78 of Costa Rica’s Constitution, The Strengthening Education Effort, whereby the government must allocate 8% of its funding toward education. During her tenure the actual figure reached 7.2%, the highest of any country in the region.

The Juan Rafael Mora Porras Road affair
In October 2010, Nicaraguan forces occupied islands in the San Juan River delta. The land is claimed by the Nicaraguan and Costa Rican governments.  Some observers opined that the Nicaraguan action was probably connected with President Daniel Ortega's reelection campaign. The Costa Rican government reacted to the Nicaraguan action.  Costa Rica sought to place the case before the International Court of Justice.  By mid-2011, President Chinchilla decided to build a road along the river, as a response to what she and her government saw as a Nicaraguan invasion of Costa Rican territory. In Spanish Name of the Road The road was officially named “Ruta 1858, Juan Rafael Mora Porras” to honor a Costa Rican hero, who led the country in the fight in Nicaragua and Costa Rica against the forces of William Walker, who had proclaimed himself as president of Nicaragua, and wanted to restore slavery in Central America.

The road was to stretch more than 150 km. A decree of emergency allowed the government to waive environmental regulations and oversight from the General Comptroller (Contraloria General de la Republica).   Neither environmental nor engineering studies were conducted before the road was announced.  There were accusations of mismanagement and corruption.  The Ministerio Publico (Costa Rican attorney general) announced an official inquiry about the charges of corruption. Francisco Jiménez, minister of public works and transportation was dismissed by Chinchilla as a consequence of the affair Minister dismissed by Chinchilla (in Spanish).

Views on society
Chinchilla developed and signed the National Network of Care Act which works to provide care and assistance to children and the elderly.

Chinchilla opposes any amendment of the constitution aimed at separation of church and state in Costa Rica. The constitution currently defines the Republic of Costa Rica as a Roman Catholic nation. Her position contrasts with that of former President Óscar Arias Sánchez, who supports establishing a secular state.

She is against legalizing the morning-after pill, which is banned in Costa Rica.

Chinchilla has stated that while she supports LGBT rights and opposes discrimination based on sexual orientation, she believes that marriage should be between a man and a woman, and because of that she supports a different legal framework for same-sex couples. She signed into law on 4 July 2013 new legislation supporting civil partnerships that can be extended to same-sex unions. She also stated that she would not oppose same-sex marriage if it was legalized by the country's courts.

Environmental protection and sustainability is very important for the President, and she continues Costa Rica's level of leadership in these areas, for example, in May 2011 she declared the film Odyssey 2050 of 'Public and Cultural Interest'.

In 2016, Chinchilla was considered one of the most powerful women in Central America according to the World Economic Forum.

Post-politics career 
Chinchilla currently teaches at Georgetown University at the Institute of Politics and Public Service and is also the titular of the Cathedra José Bonifácio, at the University of São Paulo, since 2018, and leads the Latin American Chair of Citizenship in the School of Government and Public Transformation of the Monterrey Institute of Technology and Higher Education.

Since 2016, Chinchilla has been serving as the president of the Advisory Council of She Works, a company focused on the empowerment of women; and is also a rapporteur for the freedom of expression of the Telecommunications Organization of Latin America.

In 2019, Chinchilla served on the advisory board of the annual Human Development Report of the United Nations Development Programme (UNDP), co-chaired by Thomas Piketty and Tharman Shanmugaratnam. In 2020, she was her country's candidate to head the Washington-based Inter-American Development Bank (IDB). Shortly before the vote, she dropped her bid, criticizing a process seen favoring U.S. President Donald Trump’s nominee Mauricio Claver-Carone.

In additions, Chinchilla holds numerous other positions, including the following: 
 International Institute for Democracy and Electoral Assistance (International IDEA), Member of the Board of Advisers (since 2020)
 Atlantic Council, Member of the Advisory Council to the Adrienne Arsht Latin America Center
 Club of Madrid, Vice-President
 Concordia Summit, Member of the Board
 Inter-American Dialogue, Member of the Board of Directors Co-Chair (since 2019) 
 International Olympic Committee, Member (since 2019)
 Kofi Annan Foundation, Co-Chair of the Commission on Elections and Democracy in the Digital Age (since 2019)

Awards and recognition
Chinchilla was awarded with the “Women of the Decade in Public Life and Leadership Award” at the Women Economic Forum in Amsterdam. She holds Honorary Doctorates from the University for Peace of the United Nations, Georgetown University, and Kyoto University of Foreign Studies.

Publications 
She has several publications, in Spanish and English -books, monographs and articles- on issues related to the administration of justice, citizen security, and police reform. Among the most prominent are:
Community Crime Prevention, Center for the Administration of Citizen Security Justice in Latin America, Siglo XXI Editors (2002).
Police Reforms in Latin America, Open Society Institute (2006).
Seguridad Ciudadana en América Latina y el Caribe. Laura Chinchilla and Doreen Vorndran. BID (2018).
Unfulfilled Promises. Latin America Today The InterAmerican Dialogue (2019).

In popular culture 
The 2012 song "Wonderful Journey" by Japanese group Sakura Gakuin mentions that the then President of Costa Rica shares her name with then member Raura Iida, since the Japanese pronunciations of both names are identical.

See also 

Politics of Costa Rica
Religion in Costa Rica

References

External links

laura-chinchilla.com Non-official Laura Chinchilla information portal
 Biography by CIDOB Foundation

|-

|-

|-

|-

|-

1959 births
Living people
Catholic socialists
Costa Rican Christian socialists
Costa Rican people of Spanish descent
Costa Rican Roman Catholics
Female heads of government
Female heads of state
McCourt School of Public Policy alumni
Members of the Legislative Assembly of Costa Rica
National Liberation Party (Costa Rica) politicians
People from San José, Costa Rica
Presidents of Costa Rica
Presidents pro tempore of the Community of Latin American and Caribbean States
University of Costa Rica alumni
Walsh School of Foreign Service alumni
Vice presidents of Costa Rica
Women presidents
Women government ministers of Costa Rica
Women vice presidents
Female Christian socialists
International Olympic Committee members
Female justice ministers
Justice ministers of Costa Rica
21st-century Costa Rican women politicians
21st-century Costa Rican politicians
Members of the Inter-American Dialogue